Samuel W. Buell is an American academic. He is the Bernard M. Fishman Professor of Law at the Duke University School of Law. He specializes in white-collar crime.

Works

References

Living people
Brown University alumni
New York University School of Law alumni
Duke University School of Law faculty
Year of birth missing (living people)